Lead(IV) acetate or lead tetraacetate is an organometallic compound with chemical formula . It is a colorless solid that is soluble in nonpolar, organic solvents, indicating that it is not a salt. It is degraded by moisture and is typically stored with additional acetic acid. The compound is used in organic synthesis.

Structure
In the solid state the lead(IV) centers are coordinated by four acetate ions, which are bidentate, each coordinating via two oxygen atoms. The lead atom is 8 coordinate and the O atoms form a flattened trigonal dodecahedron.

Preparation
It is typically prepared by treating of red lead with acetic acid and acetic anhydride, which absorbs water. The net reaction is shown:
Pb3O4 + 4 Ac2O -> Pb(OAc)4 + 2 Pb(OAc)2
The remaining lead(II) acetate can be partially oxidized to the tetraacetate:
2 Pb(OAc)2 + Cl2 -> Pb(OAc)4 + PbCl2

Reagent in organic chemistry
Lead tetraacetate is a strong oxidizing agent, a source of acetyloxy groups and a general reagent for the introduction of lead into organolead compounds. Some of its many uses in organic chemistry:
 Acetoxylation of benzylic, allylic and α-oxygen ether C−H bonds, for example the photochemical conversion of dioxane to 1,4-dioxene through the 2-acetoxy-1,4-dioxane intermediate  and the conversion of α-pinene to verbenone
 An alternative reagent to bromine in Hofmann rearrangement 
 Oxidation of hydrazones to diazo compounds, for example that of hexafluoroacetone hydrazone to bis(trifluoromethyl)diazomethane
 Aziridine formation, for example the reaction of N-aminophthalimide and stilbene
 Cleavage of α-hydroxy acids or 1,2-diols to their corresponding aldehydes or ketones, often replacing ozonolysis; for instance, the oxidation of di-n-butyl -tartrate to  n-butyl glyoxylate.
 Reaction with alkenes to form γ-lactones
 Oxidation of alcohols carrying a δ-proton to cyclic ethers.
 Oxidative cleavage of certain allyl alcohols in conjunction with ozone:
 Transformation of 1,2-dicarboxylic acids or cyclic anhydrides to alkenes

 Conversion of acetophenones to phenyl acetic acids
 Decarboxylation of carboxylic acids to alkyl halides in the Kochi reaction

Safety
Lead(IV) acetate may be fatal if ingested, inhaled, or absorbed through skin. It causes irritation to skin, eyes, and respiratory tract. It is a neurotoxin. It affects the gum tissue, central nervous system, kidneys, blood, and reproductive system.

References

Lead(IV) compounds
Oxidizing agents
Acetates